GRC may refer to:

Business 
 Governance, risk management, and compliance, business governance and management approach

Government and politics 
 Gender Recognition Certificate, in the United Kingdom
 Government of the Republic of China
 Greece 
 Group representation constituency in Singapore
 Royal Canadian Mounted Police

Science and technology 
 Genome Reference Consortium
 Gibson Research Corporation, an American software developer
 Glass fiber reinforced concrete
 Glenn Research Center, a NASA research center in Cleveland, Ohio
 GNU Radio Companion
 Gordon Research Conferences
 Guided-rotor compressor
 Gridcoin (GRC), a cryptocurrency

Sport 
 Glasgow Rowing Club
 Global Rallycross

Transportation
 Ghana Railway Corporation
 GRC, the National Rail station code for Great Chesterford railway station, Essex, England

Other uses 
 grc: Ancient Greek language and Medieval Greek language
 General Revenue Corporation, an American collection agency
 Governance, risk management, and compliance
 Grassroots Radio Coalition, an American advocacy group
 Green River College, in Auburn, Washington, United States
 Gulf Research Center, an Emirati think tank
 Global Repatriation Council, a fictional entity in the Marvel Cinematic Universe, appearing in the TV series The Falcon and the Winter Soldier
 Guthy-Renker, an American direct marketing firm
 Atlanta-based General Recording Corporation, which operated the GRC Records label in the 1970s